John Drake may refer to:

John Drake (mayor) (died c. 1433), medieval mayor of Dublin
John Drake (died 1628) (1556–1628), English politician
John Drake (privateer) (c. 1560–1600s), English pirate
Sir John Drake, 1st Baronet (1625–1669), English politician
John R. Drake (New York politician) (1782–1857), U.S. Representative from New York
John Poad Drake (1794–1883), inventor and artist
John Drake (1826–1895), American hotel magnate
John M. Drake (1830–1913), Union Army officer during the American Civil War
John Drake (1872–1964), American hotel magnate
John Drake (cricketer) (1893–1967), English cricketer
Johnny Drake (1916–1973), American football player
John W. Drake, American microbiologist
John Drake (rugby union) (1959–2008), New Zealand rugby footballer
John Drake, singer for the band The Amboy Dukes

Character 
John Drake (Danger Man), character of the eponymous series

See also
Jack Drake (disambiguation)
John Drake Sloat